Damek is a village development committee in Baglung District in the Dhaulagiri Zone of central Nepal. At the time of the 1991 Nepal census it had a population of 5,824 and had 1072 houses in the town.

Damek is the largest V. D. C. in Baglung District. It is situated in a hilly area.

References

Populated places in Baglung District